The Berlin Genesis (Warsaw, University Library), designated as Rahlfs 911, is a 3rd or 4th century manuscript on papyrus. It contains the text of Genesis 1:18-38:5 in Greek.

References 
 Ernst Würthwein, Alexander Achilles Fischer: The Text of the Old Testament. An Introduction to the Biblia Hebraica. 2014, p. 270
 Frederic G. Kenyon: Our Bible and the ancient manuscripts. 4th edition, Eyre & Spottiswoode, London 1939, (911.)

External links 
 Digitalisat Warsaw Institut for Papyrology
 The History of the Berlin Papyri at the Warsaw Institut for Papyrology

Septuagint manuscripts